Peer Moberg (born 14 February 1971) is a Norwegian sailor and Olympic medalist. He competed at the 1996 Summer Olympics in Atlanta, where he received a bronze medal in the Laser class.

He competed in the Finn class at the 2008 Summer Olympics in Beijing.

References

External links
 
 

1971 births
Living people
Norwegian male sailors (sport)
Olympic sailors of Norway
Sailors at the 1996 Summer Olympics – Laser
Sailors at the 2000 Summer Olympics – Laser
Sailors at the 2004 Summer Olympics – Laser
Sailors at the 2008 Summer Olympics – Finn
Olympic bronze medalists for Norway
Olympic medalists in sailing
5.5 Metre class sailors
Europe class sailors
Medalists at the 1996 Summer Olympics
Norwegian sports coaches